Dooriyan was a Punjabi album by renowned singer and actor Amrinder Gill. Dooriyan became a highly successful album continuing Amrinder's success from his previous album Ishq. Sukhshinder Shinda gave music to the album, this is the third Amrinder Gill album he has produced (Dildarian and Ishq being the other two).

The music video for Tere Bina has been critically acclaimed, being nominated for an award. It was the first music video from the album. Later music videos for Maar Sutya, Punn Khat Le, Dabbi and Tere Karke were released.

Track listing

Awards
Dooriyan was nominated for several awards at the 2010 Punjabi Music Awards. These awards are:

References

External links 

2009 albums
Amrinder Gill albums